Rhea Tregebov (born 1953) is a Canadian poet, novelist and children's writer who lives in Vancouver, British Columbia. In her work as teacher and editor, she has mentored and inspired generations of Canadian poets . Her poetry is characterized by a strong poetic voice, intellectual honesty, and a compassionate engagement with the extraordinary lived experience of “ordinary” life. An early influence was Pablo Neruda: “And it was at that age … Poetry arrived/in search of me. […] there I was without a face/and it touched me.” (from “Poesía”). Tregebov is also the author of two novels, Rue des Rosiers and The Knife-Sharpener’s Bell, as well as five popular children’s picture books.

Background 
Born in Saskatoon, Saskatchewan and raised in Winnipeg, Manitoba, Tregebov attended the University of Manitoba, Cornell and Boston universities. For many years she lived in Toronto, working as a freelance writer, editor, and Creative Writing Instructor. She taught Continuing Education for Ryerson University and was on faculty at the Banff Centre for the Arts. In January 2005 she has hired by the Creative Writing Program at the University of British Columbia, where she was promoted to Associate Professor in 2012. At UBC she specialized in poetry, writing for children, and translation. In June 2017, she retired from UBC; she currently is an Associate Professor Emerita.

Bibliography

Poetry
Remembering History – 1982 (winner of the Pat Lowther Award), 
No One We Know – 1986, 
The Proving Grounds – 1991, 
Mapping the Chaos – 1995, 
The Strength of Materials – 2001, 
(alive): Selected and new poems – 2004, 
All Souls''' 2012 

Children's booksThe Extraordinary Ordinary Everything Room – 1991, The Big Storm – 1992, Sasha and the Wiggly Tooth – 1993, Sasha and the Wind – 1996, What-If Sara – 1999, 

NovelsThe Knife Sharpener's Bell – 2009, Rue des Rosiers'' – 2019,

See also

References 

1953 births
20th-century Canadian novelists
20th-century Canadian poets
21st-century Canadian novelists
21st-century Canadian poets
Canadian children's writers
Canadian women poets
Living people
Writers from Saskatoon
Writers from Vancouver
Writers from Winnipeg
Canadian women children's writers
Canadian women novelists
20th-century Canadian women writers
21st-century Canadian women writers